Biosca is a village in the province of Lleida and autonomous community of Catalonia, Spain.

Population history 
1900 – 835
1930 – 670
1950 – 585
1981 – 382
1986 – 283

References

External links
 Government data pages 

Municipalities in Segarra